Weona Park Carousel, also known as Dentzel Stationary Menagerie Carousel, is a historic carousel located at Pen Argyl, Northampton County, Pennsylvania. The carousel and its pavilion were built in 1923. The carousel is housed in a wooden, one story, pavilion measuring 20 feet high at center and 80 feet in diameter, with 24 sections each 10 feet 6 inches wide. The carousel has 44 animals and 2 sleighs standing three abreast. They were originally hand carved and painted in the 1890s, c. 1905, and c. 1917. The carousel has a Wurlitzer organ, opus 146. It was constructed by the Dentzel Carousel Company of Philadelphia, Pennsylvania.

It was added to the National Register of Historic Places in 1999.

Gallery

References

Carousels on the National Register of Historic Places in Pennsylvania
Amusement rides introduced in 1923
Buildings and structures in Northampton County, Pennsylvania
National Register of Historic Places in Northampton County, Pennsylvania
Tourist attractions in Northampton County, Pennsylvania
Carousels in Pennsylvania
1923 establishments in Pennsylvania